Charles Waterhouse "Chip" Goodyear IV (born January 18, 1958) is an American businessman and the former CEO of BHP Billiton. He is a member of the Goodyear family that had extensive business interests in lumber and railways, as well as significant philanthropic endeavors.

Early life
Charles Waterhouse Goodyear IV was born on January 18, 1958, in Hartford, Connecticut. He is the son of Charles Waterhouse Goodyear III (born 1933), a Texas oil man who worked for Exxon Company International (and later as a fuel products marketing manager for Exxon in Florham Park, NJ), of Darien, Connecticut.

Goodyear graduated from Yale University in 1980 with a science degree in geology and geophysics. While at Yale, he rowed on the lightweight crew team. He also received an MBA from the Wharton School of the University of Pennsylvania in 1983.

Career
After graduation in 1983, Goodyear began his career as an investment banker at a Wall Street brokerage, Kidder Peabody, advising companies on mergers, acquisitions and financing.  He left Kidder Peabody in 1989 as Vice President and joined Freeport-McMoRan, one of the world's largest producers of copper and gold, as Vice President - Corporate Finance. He was promoted to Executive Vice President and chief financial officer in 1995, ultimately leaving the firm in 1997 to serve as president of "Goodyear Capital Corporation" until 1999.

In 1999, Goodyear joined BHP Billiton, the world's largest diversified resources company, as CFO. He served in that role until 2001, when he became Chief Development Officer, a post he held until 2003. In 2003, it was announced that Goodyear would succeed Brian Gilbertson as the chief executive officer of BHP.

Goodyear retired from BHP on September 30, 2007, and from the BHP Group on January 1, 2008, and was succeeded by Marius Kloppers. Goodyear was considered by Businessweek to have been responsible for BHP Billiton's turn-around during the 2000s since, under his leadership, sales increased by 47% and profits by 78%, placing him on top of their "Europe BW50 Leaders" list. Others, including consulting firm Deloitte, attributed BHP's success to rising global commodity prices.

On February 6, 2009, Temasek Holdings, which had a portfolio worth 185 billion Singapore dollars ($123 billion US dollars) at the time, announced his appointment as a board member and CEO-designate, to commence on March 1, 2009, succeeding Ho Ching from October 1, 2009. He was identified as a possible candidate for the top office in Temasek in 2007, when the Temasek Board began reviewing internal and external CEO candidates since early 2005. Goodyear would have been the first foreign executive to run the Singaporean sovereign fund company,
however, on July 21, 2009, the Temasek Board and Goodyear announced that they had mutually agreed that he would not be taking over as CEO, citing differences in opinions on strategy. Instead, Ho Ching continued in the position, while Goodyear stepped down on August 15, 2009.

As of September 2015, Goodyear is again the president of "Goodyear Capital Corporation" and "Goodyear Investment Company".

Personal life
On July 11, 1992, 34-year-old Goodyear married 28-year-old Elizabeth Morris Dabezies, the daughter of Dr. and Mrs. Oliver H. Dabezies Jr. of New Orleans. Dr. Dabezies was an ophthalmologist in New Orleans and a clinical professor of ophthalmology at Tulane University. The Rev. Thomas Condon performed the Roman Catholic ceremony at the chapel of the Academy of the Sacred Heart in New Orleans, Louisiana.  Elizabeth Dabezies graduated from the University of Alabama and worked as a leasing manager with the Edward J. DeBartolo Corporation, a real-estate firm in New Orleans.

Together, they have two children:
Charles W. Goodyear V
Adelaide Goodyear (born January 14, 1995)

Goodyear is a member of the National Petroleum Council and International Council on Mining and Metals.

Volunteer and philanthropy
Goodyear served as a member of the Yale University Tomorrow Campaign Committee. He currently serves on the President's Council on International Activities and as Chairman of the Jackson Institute Council, and he was named Successor Trustee of the Yale Corporation in 2011. Goodyear is also a director of several private companies and is a member of the Prince's Charities Council in the United Kingdom.

References

External links
 Bogalusa Story by C. W. Goodyear
 City of Bogalusa
 Fund for Bogalusa
 Bogalusa, Washington Parish, Louisiana: History, Links, Maps, and Photos
 Bogalusa Daily News
 Temple-Inland Inc.

1958 births
Living people
Goodyear family (New York)
Yale University alumni
Wharton School of the University of Pennsylvania alumni
American businesspeople
Australian businesspeople
BHP people